The Hansabanka Baltic Open was a golf tournament on the Swedish Golf Tour and the Nordic Golf League. It was held at the Ozo Golf Club in Riga, Latvia, between 2005 and 2008.

Winners

References

Swedish Golf Tour events
Golf tournaments in Latvia
2005 establishments in Latvia
2008 disestablishments in Latvia